Two ships of the Royal Navy and one of the Royal Fleet Auxiliary have borne the name Proteus, after Proteus, a sea-god in Greek mythology:

 was a 26-gun sixth rate, formerly the East Indiaman Talbot, purchased in 1777 for use as a receiving ship. The ship was sold in 1783.
 was a  launched in 1929 and sold in 1946.
 is the first planned Multi-Role Ocean Surveillance Ship, purchased in 2022 for conversion and commissioning in 2023.

Royal Navy ship names